The Mysterious Benedict Society and the Riddle of Ages is a 2019 children's novel written by Trenton Lee Stewart and illustrated by Manu Montoya. It is the fourth book in the Mysterious Benedict Society series, following The Mysterious Benedict Society and the Prisoner's Dilemma (2009).

Plot 
In The Mysterious Benedict Society and the Riddle of Ages, the Ten Men have escaped prison and are loose in the city of Stonetown. While the families of Sticky, Reynie, and Constance prepare to leave by ship for their own safety, the three sneak back ashore to await the villains' next move.

Reception 
Kirkus Reviews called the book "Clever as ever—if slow off the mark—and positively laden with tics, quirks, and puns." The American Booksellers Association named The Mysterious Benedict Society and the Riddle of Ages one of their ABC Best Books for Young Readers in 2019.

References 

2019 American novels
The Mysterious Benedict Society
Little, Brown and Company books